Dalton Gates is a hamlet in the Richmondshire district of North Yorkshire, England. 

The hamlet was built up around the now disused railway station that formed part of the disbanded Richmond Line. The station building is now a residential property.

The placename Dalton comes from Old English and means settlement in the dale; here it refers to the nearby Dalton-on-Tees and Gates refers to the gates that were used on the railway level crossing. There is evidence that prior to the arrival of the railway the area was known as Straggleton.

Dalton Gates is now served by the number 72 bus between Darlington and Northallerton.

Paddock Farm Water Gardens is situated in Dalton Gates.

References

Hamlets in North Yorkshire